(Here I Stand) in the Spirit of Paul Robeson is a public artwork by American artist Allen Uzikee Nelson, located at the intersection of Kansas Ave NW, Georgia Ave NW and Varnum St NW in the Petworth neighborhood in Washington, D.C., United States. It is a tribute to musician, actor, and social activist Paul Robeson.

Description

This Cor-Ten steel sculpture stands like a sign in the middle of the intersection. It rises upwards and opens into a large face with heavy African influences. The greenish glass frames the face. The artist describes it as a "Janus-face".

Artist

Originally from Tupelo, Mississippi, Uzikee now lives in Washington, D.C. His background in engineering provides a basis for his work. His creative goal is to combine "African design and aesthetic into subconscious culture." All of his works are three-dimensional, steel and glass. His work has been on display at Howard University, Martin Luther King Jr. Memorial Library, and throughout the United States.

Acquisition

The piece was formally dedicated on April 8, 2001, to celebrate the 103rd anniversary of Paul Robeson's birthday.

References

External links
Prince of Petworth meets Nelson

2001 establishments in Washington, D.C.
2001 sculptures
Outdoor sculptures in Washington, D.C.
Petworth (Washington, D.C.)
Paul Robeson
Steel sculptures in Washington, D.C.